Operación Triunfo is a Spanish reality television music competition to find new singing talent. The eighth series, also known as Operación Triunfo 2011, aired on Telecinco from 16 January 2011 and had a considerably shorter run than the earlier series. Early reasons reported for this were poor ratings, but tensions and disagreements between Gest Music Endemol and Telecinco (the production company and the TV channel, respectively) have been presented as the main reason for its early discontinuation, airing its final on 20 February 2011. The season was presented by Pilar Rubio and won by Nahuel Sachak.

Headmaster, judges and presenter
Headmaster: Nina
Judges: Noemí Galera and Eva Perales
Presenter: Pilar Rubio

Contestants

Galas

Results summary
Colour key

External links
Operación Triunfo on Telecinco site

Operación Triunfo
2011 Spanish television seasons